Halina Łukomska (29 April 1929 in Suchedniów, Poland – 30 August 2016 in Kąty near Warsaw, Poland) was a Polish soprano. She was married to composer  Augustyn Bloch.

Selected premieres
Dimitri Terzakis:
Sappho-Fragmente (1977), premiered on 17 April 1980
Erotikon (1979), premiered on 19 April 1980 by Wittener Tage für neue Kammermusik, Halina Lukomska (sopr.), Spiros Argiris (conductor)

Selected recordings
 Pli selon pli (1969, Boulez, composer and conductor).
 Anton Webern: opp. 1–31 (soprano in most of the vocal works, along with Heather Harper.) (recordings made 1969-70, now reissued on Sony Classical.)
 Alban Berg: Three Pieces for Orchestra; Chamber Concerto; Altenburg Lieder op. 4. (Released in 1968.)
 George Frideric Handel: Silete venti (on Harmonia Mundi, 1962)
 Karol Szymanowski: a collection of songs. (issued on CD in 1990)
 Johann Christian Bach: Confitebor tibi Domine, cantata for solo, choir, and orchestra (1759) (Harmonia Mundi LP, 1973)
 Witold Lutosławski: collected edition on EMI CD, including five songs. (EMI, 2004).

Sources

1929 births
Living people
Polish women singers
Polish sopranos
Polish operatic sopranos